The list of ship commissionings in 1885 includes a chronological list of all ships commissioned in 1885.


See also 

1885
 Ship commissionings